Ursaq forestry's settlement is a rural locality (a posyolok) in Qaybıç District, Tatarstan. The population was 55 as of 2010.

Geography 
Ursaq forestry's settlement is located 12 km northeast of Olı Qaybıç, district's administrative centre, and 110 km southwest of Qazan, republic's capital, by road.

History 
The village was established in 1938.

Until 1963 was a part of Qaybıç District: After 1963 in Bua (1963–1964),  Apas (1964–1991) and Qaybıç districts.

References

External links 
 

Rural localities in Kaybitsky District